Royal Air Force Barkston Heath or RAF Barkston Heath  is a Royal Air Force Relief Landing Ground under the command of RAF Cranwell near Grantham, Lincolnshire, England.

RAF Barkston Heath has the Naval Element of No. 3 Flying Training School RAF (3 FTS) which, for a period between approximately 1995 and 2010, operated the Slingsby T67M260 Firefly, followed by the Grob Tutor T1 operated between 2010 and 2018.

No. 3 FTS currently provide elementary flying training for Royal Navy students on the Grob Prefect T1. A secondary role of RAF Barkston Heath is as a Relief Landing Ground for the flying training activities at RAF Cranwell.

History 
Barkston Heath was constructed in 1936 and was initially used as a satellite station for RAF Cranwell.

United States Army Air Forces use

In late 1943, Barkston Heath was made available to the United States Army Air Force's Ninth Air Force. It was earmarked for basing troop carrier units scheduled to be transferred from Sicily to participate in the forthcoming cross-Channel invasion, Operation Overlord.  During its time as a USAAF airfield, Barkston Heath was designated as USAAF station 483.

61st Troop Carrier Group 
The first US personnel arrived on 13 February from Sciacca, Sicily, and most of their Douglas C-47 Skytrains on the 17th and 18th, although not all aircraft were in place until a month later. These new occupants were the 61st Troop Carrier Group.

The 61st TCG was part of the 52nd Troop Carrier Wing, IX Troop Carrier Command.  The headquarters of the 61st Troop Carrier Group moved to an Advanced Landing Ground (ALG) at Abbeville (ALG B-92), France, on 13 March 1945, but its squadrons went to RAF Chipping Ongar from where they participated in Operation Varsity on 24 March carrying British paratroops who dropped near Wesel.

349th Troop Carrier Group 
An increased demand for theatre air transport brought the 349th TCG from Baer Field, Indiana in late March 1945, with its Curtiss C-46 Commando transports. Group headquarters was established at Barkston on 30 March, but the group only remained three weeks before moving to Rove/Amy, France, on 18 April.

Royal Air Force use
The USAAF returned control of the airfield to the Air Ministry in June 1945 when the war in Europe ended. From 1983 to 1989 Barkston was home to 'A' Flight 25 Squadron (with Bristol Bloodhound surface-to-air missiles) when they returned from RAF Bruggen in Germany.

Elementary Flying Training 

On 1 April 1995, the Joint Elementary Flying Training School (JEFTS), which provided training to RAF and Fleet Air Arm (FAA) pilots, relocated to Barkston Heath from RAF Topcliffe in North Yorkshire. The school was equipped with eighteen civilian registered Slingsby T67M Firefly trainer aircraft.

In 1996 the Army Air Corps (AAC) joined JEFTS and the school operated as a tri-service organisation until 2003 when the RAF decided to instead provide elementary flying training through its network of University Air Squadrons. JEFTS as a result was renamed the Defence Elementary Flying Training School in July 2003, with the FAA element re-establishing itself as 703 Naval Air Squadron (703 NAS) and the AAC element as No. 674 Squadron.

In November 2009 the Fireflies were retired and replaced with the Grob Tutor T1.

In April 2021, No. 674 Squadron was stood-down as ACC pilots will no longer be trained on the Prefect prior to rotary wing training at RAF Shawbury.

Other units
The following units were also here at some point:

No. 1 Elementary Flying Training School RAF
No. 2 Central Flying School RAF
No. 2 Flying Instructors School RAF
No. 3 (Coastal) Operational Training Unit RAF
No. 7 Equipment Disposal Depot RAF
No. 85 Squadron RAF
RAF College
RAF College Flying Training School RAF
RAF College Service Flying Training School RAF

Infrastructure and facilities 

The airfield has limited facilities and relies on its parent station RAF Cranwell for support. The main building at Barkston Heath is the Operational Support Building which was re-opened in January 2018 after refurbishment as part of the UK Military Flying Training System (UKMFTS) programme. It was renamed the Esmonde Building in memory of Lieutenant Commander Eugene Esmonde, a distinguished Fleet Air Arm pilot who was a posthumous recipient of the Victoria Cross.

Out of six T2 type hangar and one B1 type constructed during the Second World War, only two T2 type remain on the site.

The airfield contains the decaying remains of an English Electric Canberra at the northern edge of the airfield site.

Role and operations

Defence Elementary Flying Training School 

RAF Barkston Heath is home to the Defence Elementary Flying Training School, comprising 57 Squadron RAF, operating the Grob Prefect T1 in the elementary flying training role. Aircraft and support are provided by a civilian contractor, Ascent Flight Training, as part of the UK Military Flying Training System contract. Ascent also provides a significant proportion of the instructional staff, the Air Traffic Control service is provided by NATS Solutions Ltd, Affinity provide engineering personnel and other Station support personnel are provided by NBC and the MoD.

Although the school trains Fleet Air Arm crews, it is under the command of the RAF's No. 3 Flying Training School, based at nearby RAF Cranwell.

703 Naval Air Squadron 
703 NAS trains Fleet Air Arm pilots destined to fly both rotary (AgustaWestland Merlin and AgustaWestland Wildcat) and fixed wing aircraft (Lockheed Martin F-35B II Lightning and BAE Hawk). Helicopter students graduate to No. 1 Flying Training School (1 FTS) at RAF Shawbury in Shropshire, whereas fast jet students move onto No. 4 Flying Training School at RAF Valley in Anglesey.

Relief Landing Ground 
Barkston Heath acts as a Relief Landing Ground for the flying training activities at RAF Cranwell, which is four minutes flying time away.

Based units
The following flying units are based at RAF Barkston Heath. The station is also regularly used as relief landing ground by aircraft based at nearby RAF Cranwell.

Royal Air Force 
No. 22 Group (Training) RAF

No. 3 Flying Training School / Defence Elementary Flying Training School
No. 57 Squadron – Grob Prefect T1

See also

 List of Royal Air Force stations

References

Citations

Bibliography
 Bruce Barrymore Halpenny Action Stations: Wartime Military Airfields of Lincolnshire and the East Midlands v. 2
 Freeman, Roger A. (1994) UK Airfields of the Ninth: Then and Now 1994. After the Battle 
 Freeman, Roger A. (1996) The Ninth Air Force in Colour: UK and the Continent-World War Two. After the Battle 
 Maurer, Maurer (1983). Air Force Combat Units of World War II. Maxwell AFB, Alabama: Office of Air Force History. .

External links

Royal Navy – Elementary Flying Training
UK Military Aeronautical Information Publication – Barkston Heath (EGYE)

Royal Air Force stations in Lincolnshire
Airports in England
Airfields of the IX Troop Carrier Command in the United Kingdom
South Kesteven District
Airports in the East Midlands